The 2012 Vaahteraliiga season was the 33rd season of the highest level of American football in Finland. The regular season took place between May 26 and August 13, 2012. The Finnish champion was determined in the playoffs and at the championship game Vaahteramalja XXXIII the Helsinki Roosters won the Helsinki Wolverines.

Standings

Playoffs

References

American football in Finland
Vaahteraliiga
Vaahteraliiga